The Daza Cabinet constituted the 36th to 37th cabinets of the Republic of Bolivia. It was formed on 28 October 1876, four months after Hilarión Daza was installed) as the 19th president of Bolivia following a coup d'état, succeeding the Frías Cabinet. It was dissolved on 28 December 1879 upon Daza's overthrow in another coup d'état and was succeeded by the Cabinet of Narciso Campero.

Composition

History

Cabinet

References

Notes

Footnotes

Bibliography 

 

1876 establishments in Bolivia
1879 disestablishments in Bolivia
Cabinets of Bolivia
Cabinets established in 1876
Cabinets disestablished in 1879